The Jewish Council of the Emirates (JCE) is the representative body of Part of the Jewish community in Dubai.

Although the Jewish community in the UAE is older, the JCE was formalized with its constitution in 2018. The JCE has more than 100 active members of diverse orientations, including orthodox, conservative and reform. In September 2020, the JCE announced that it would formally affiliate with the World Jewish Congress, an international organization that represents Jewish communities in 100 countries.

Rabbi Yehuda Sarna and President Ross Kriel lead the Council. In recent remarks, Ambassador Yousef Al Otaiba, Ambassador of the United Arab Emirates to the United States, noted that Sarna and Kriel had been instrumental in taking care of and looking after the Jewish community.

With the signing and ratification of the Abraham Accords – a historic agreement to normalize relations between the UAE and Israel, the JCE aims to act as a bridge between Emirati authorities and Jews living in the country, contribute to the diversity and pluralism of the UAE and advance interfaith harmony. According to Sarna, the JCE intends to be an example community in the Gulf for “dialogue and interfaith cooperation.”

The Council also operates a synagogue in Dubai, where they have been organizing a formalized prayer group (a “minyan”) for nearly every Jewish sabbath and major festival since 2013.

History 
The JCE is the country’s oldest congregation and recognized by local authorities. The JCE community has been gathering since 2010, with a house known as The Villa serving as a community center since 2015. The JCE was formally established in 2019.

In October 2020, the JCE announced the appointment of Elie Abadie, as the JCE’s senior rabbi. A prominent rabbi and scholar of Sephardic Judaism, Abadie is relocating from New York City to serve as the JCE’s senior rabbi.

Background 
The Jewish community in the United Arab Emirates (UAE) is small. There are currently two active synagogues. Talmud Torah (Jewish school) opened in 2020 and currently has 40 pupils. As of 2019, according to Rabbi Marc Schneier, it is estimated that there are about 150 families to 3,000 Jews who live and worship freely in the UAE. As of 2020 over 2,000 Jewish people live in the UAE.

Viewpoints 
According to Ross Kriel, the UAE has a culture of tolerance, particularly towards the Abrahamic religions. He believes the UAE Government’s welcoming approach to the community is entirely values based, and is not a strategic move on their part to try and curry favor or achieve a political objective.

The JCE hailed the Abraham Accords as a peace agreement that can have a transformative effect for Muslim-Jewish understanding and cooperation across the Middle East. Rabbi Yehuda Sarna called the Accords a history-making milestone worthy of bearing the name of Abraham, "Today was not just the eve of the Jewish New Year, but the dawn of a new era for the entire Middle East. The true significance of these Accords is not to be found in some 'room where it happened', but in the doors it will open."

Objectives 
According to its constitution, the JCE’s mission is focused on advancing the unity, welfare, standing and security of Jews living in the UAE by bridging the Muslim and Jewish communities and cultivating broader dialogue and cooperation.

Over the past several years, Emirati authorities have attempted to foster greater interfaith dialogue and understanding. This has included hosting high-level interfaith delegations and events as well as pledges to build a multi-faith “Abrahamic Family House” complex that includes a synagogue. As a result, the JCE hopes to support the flourishing diversity and pluralism of the UAE.

Leadership 
The JCE is led by Yehuda Sarna, Chief Rabbi; Ross Kriel, President; and the Governing Committee made up of ten community leaders.  In October 2020, the JCE announced that Dr. Elie Abadie will join the organization as the new Senior Rabbi in Residence, working “on-the-ground” to provides spiritual leadership.

Activities 
The JCE has been known as “the underground synagogue” conducting regular services for almost a decade while keeping its operations mostly hidden from public view. The JCE has conducted Bar Mitzvahs, Bat Mitzvahs, and Brit Milahs. The only religious ceremony yet to take place is a wedding.

In 2020 the JCE celebrated Rosh Hashanah with a virtual address from His Excellency Yousef Al Otaiba, the U.A.E.’s Ambassador to the United States. This reflected an unprecedented level of official state participation in a Jewish religious event.

See also 
 Jewish Community Center of UAE
 History of the Jews in the United Arab Emirates

References 

Jews and Judaism in the United Arab Emirates
Jewish organizations established in 2019
2019 establishments in the United Arab Emirates